was the eighth of the fifty-three stations (shukuba) of the Tōkaidō. It is located in the present-day town of Ōiso, located in Naka District, Kanagawa Prefecture, Japan.

History
Ōiso-juku was established in 1601, along with the other original post stations along the Tōkaidō, by Tokugawa Ieyasu. In 1604, Ieyasu planted a  colonnade of pine and hackberry trees, to provide shade for the travelers.

The classic ukiyo-e print by Andō Hiroshige (Hōeidō edition) from 1831–1834 depicts travelers in straw raincoats entering a village by the ocean during pouring rain. One is mounted, and the other is on foot. The road is lined with pine trees. By contrast, the Kyōka edition of the late 1830s depicts a prosperous village overlooking a wide expanse of Sagami Bay with the mountains of the Izu Peninsula on the far shore.

Neighboring post towns
Tōkaidō
Hiratsuka-juku - Ōiso-juku - Odawara-juku

References

Further reading

Carey, Patrick. Rediscovering the Old Tokaido:In the Footsteps of Hiroshige. Global Books UK (2000). 
Chiba, Reiko. Hiroshige's Tokaido in Prints and Poetry. Tuttle. (1982) 
Taganau, Jilly. The Tokaido Road: Travelling and Representation in Edo and Meiji Japan. RoutledgeCurzon (2004). 

Stations of the Tōkaidō
Stations of the Tōkaidō in Kanagawa Prefecture